Vita Heine (née Pētersone; born 21 November 1984) is a racing cyclist, who currently rides for UCI Women's Continental Team .

Career
Born in Riga in Latvia, Heine competed for Latvia in the 2013 UCI women's road race in Florence. She obtained Norwegian citizenship from 1 July 2014, and joined Norwegian-based  on 1 September 2014. She remained with the team until the end of the 2020 season, joining  from 2021.

Major results

2011
 3rd Time trial, Latvian National Road Championships

2013
 2nd Time trial, Latvian National Road Championships

2014
 2nd Time trial, Latvian National Road Championships

2016
 Norwegian National Road Championships
1st  Road race
1st  Time trial
 1st  Overall NEA
1st Stage 1a (ITT) & 2
 KZN Summer Series
1st Races 1 & 2
 4th Chrono des Nations

2017
 Norwegian National Road Championships
1st  Road race
1st  Time trial
 1st  Mountains classification Belgium Tour

2018
 1st  Road race, Norwegian National Road Championships

2019
 1st  Time trial, Norwegian National Road Championships

Footnotes

References

External links

1984 births
Living people
Latvian female cyclists
Norwegian female cyclists
Sportspeople from Riga
Latvian emigrants to Norway
Naturalised citizens of Norway
Cyclists at the 2016 Summer Olympics
Olympic cyclists of Norway